The Soldiers Delight Natural Environment Area, consists of about  of land in Owings Mills, Maryland, USA.
Much of the area of Soldiers Delight contains a serpentine barren that contains a number of rare and endangered species of plants.

The following list of herbaceous plants is based greatly on the work of Ed Uebel
and comes from the publications by Fleming et al. 1995,
Monteferrante 1973,
Reed 1984,
Wennerstrom 1995,
and the unpublished data by Worthley 1955-1985.

List of Wildflowers of the Soldiers Delight Natural Environment Area
Division Magnoliophyta - Angiosperms

Class Magnoliopsida - Dicotyledons

Amaranthaceae - (Amaranth Family)
Amaranthus retroflexus  - Pigweed

Apiaceae - (Carrot Family)
Daucus carota  - Queen Anne's lace

Apocynaceae - (Dogbane Family)
Apocynoideae - Subfamily
Apocynum androsaemifolium  - Spreading dogbane
Apocynum cannabinum  - Indian hemp
Asclepiadoideae - Subfamily
Asclepias amplexicaulis  - Blunt-leaved milkweed
Asclepias incarnata  - Swamp milkweed
Asclepias syriaca  - Common milkweed
Asclepias verticillata  - Whorled milkweed
Asclepias viridiflora  - Green milkweed

Asteraceae - (Aster Family)
Achillea millefolium  - Yarrow
Ambrosia artemisiifolia  - Common ragweed
Ambrosia trifida  - Giant ragweed [M, Wo]
Ageratina altissima  - White snakeroot
Ageratina aromatica  - Aromatic thoroughwort
Anaphalis margaritacea  - Pearly everlasting
Antennaria plantaginifolia  - Plantain-leaf pussytoes
Anthemis arvensis  - Field chamomile
Anthemis cotula  - Mayweed, dogfennel
Aster tataricus  - Tatarian aster
Bidens bipinnata  - Spanish needles
Bidens frondosa  - Devil's beggartick
Bidens polylepis  - Tickseed sunflower
Carduus nutans  - Musk thistle
Leucanthemum vulgare  - Ox-eye daisy
Chrysopsis mariana  - Maryland golden aster
Cichorium intybus  – Chicory
Cirsium arvense  - Canada thistle
Cirsium discolor  - Field thistle [Hand-out]
Cirsium horridulum Michx. - Yellow thistle
Cirsium muticum Michx. - Swamp thistle
Erechtites hieraciifolius (L.) Raf. - Pilewort, fireweed
Erigeron annuus (L.) Pers. - Daisy or Annual Fleabane
Erigeron canadensis  - Horseweed
Erigeron pulchellus Michx. - Robin's Plantain
Erigeron strigosus Muhl. ex Willd. - Daisy Fleabane
Eupatorium altissimum L.  - Tall Thoroughwort
Eupatorium perfoliatum L. - Boneset
Eutrochium fistulosum Barratt - Joe-pye weed
Eupatorium sessilifolium L. - Upland boneset
Eurybia divaricata (L.) G.L.Nesom (Syn. Aster divaricatus) - White wood aster
Eurybia schreberi (Nees) Nees (Syn. Aster schreberi) - Schreber's aster
Euthamia graminifolia (L.) Nutt. (Syn. Solidago graminifolia) - Lance-leaf goldenrod
Galinsoga quadriradiata Ruiz & Pav. - Galinsoga
Helenium autumnale L. - Yellow sneezeweed
Helianthus annuus L. - Sunflower
Helianthus decapetalus L. - Thin-leaf sunflower
Heliopsis helianthoides (L.) Sweet - Ox-eye
Hieracium caespitosum Dumort - Yellow king devil
Hieracium gronovii L. - Hairy hawkweed
Hieracium paniculatum L. - Panicled Hawkweed
Hieracium scabrum Michx. - Rough Hawkweed
Hieracium venosum L. - Rattlesnake Weed
Ionactis linariifolia (L.) Greene (Syn. Aster linariifolius) - Flax-leaf white-top aster
Krigia virginica (L.) Willd. – Dwarf dandelion
Lactuca saligna L. – Willow-leaf lettuce
Lactuca serriola L. – Prickly lettuce
Liatris graminifolia Willd. – Grass-leaf Blazing-star
Liatris spicata (L.) Willd. - Spiked Blazing-star {G5, S1} 
Matricaria discoidea DC. – Pineapple Weed
Mikania scandens (L.) Willd. – Climbing Hempweed
Oclemena acuminata (Michx.) Greene (Syn. Aster acuminatus) - Whorled Wood Aster
Packera anonyma (Wood) W.A.Weber & A.Löve (Syn. Senecio smallii, Senecio anonymus) - Southern Ragwort
Packera paupercula (Michx.) A.Löve & D.Löve (Syn. Senecio balsamitae, Senecio pauperculus) - Balsam Ragwort, Balsam Groundsel
Pseudognaphalium obtusifolium (L.) Hilliard & B.L.Burtt (Syn. Gnaphalium obtusifolium) - Rabbit-tobacco, Sweet Everlasting, Fragrant Cudweed
Rudbeckia hirta L. – Black-eyed Susan
Rudbeckia laciniata L. – Cutleaf coneflower, Green-head Coneflower
Rudbeckia triloba L. – Three-lobed Coneflower
Sericocarpus asteroides (L.) Britton, Sterns & Poggenb. (Syn. Aster paternus) - Toothed White-top Aster
Solidago bicolor L. - Silver-rod
Solidago caesia L. - Blue-stemmed Goldenrod
Solidago canadensis L. - Canada Goldenrod
Solidago canadensis L. var. scabra Torr. & A.Gray - Tall Goldenrod
Solidago gigantea Aiton - Late Goldenrod
Solidago hispida Muhl. - Hispid Goldenrod{G5, SH, X}
Solidago juncea Aiton - Early Goldenrod
Solidago nemoralis Aiton - Gray Goldenrod
Solidago patula Muhl. - Rough-leaved Goldenrod
Solidago rigida L. - Stiff Goldenrod
Solidago rugosa Mill. - Wrinkle-leaf Goldenrod
Solidago stricta Aiton - Willow-leaf Goldenrod
Solidago ulmifolia Muhl. ex Willd. - Elm-leaf Goldenrod
Taraxacum officinale Weber - Dandelion
Symphyotrichum cordifolium (L.) G.L.Nesom (Syn. Aster cordifolius) - Common blue wood aster 
Symphyotrichum depauperatum (Fernald) G.L.Nesom (Syn. Aster depauperatus) - Eastern Serpentine Aster {G2, S1, E}
Symphyotrichum dumosum (L.) G.L.Nesom (Syn. Aster dumosum) - Rice Button Aster
Symphyotrichum ericoides (L.) G.L.Nesom (Syn. Aster ericoides) - White Heath Aster
Symphyotrichum laeve (L.) A.Löve & D.Löve (Syn. Aster laevis) - Smooth Blue Aster
Symphyotrichum lateriflorum (L.) A.Löve & D.Löve (Syn. Aster lateriflorus) - Calico Aster
Symphyotrichum novae-angliae (L.) G.L.Nesom (Syn. Aster novae-angliae) - New England Aster
Symphyotrichum novi-belgii (L.) G.L.Nesom (Syn. Aster novi-belgii) - New York Aster
Symphyotrichum patens (Aiton) G.L.Nesom (Syn. Aster patens) - Late Purple Aster
Symphyotrichum pilosum (Willd.) G.L.Nesom (Syn. Aster pilosus) - Hairy White Heath Aster
Symphyotrichum racemosum (Elliott) G.L.Nesom (Syn. Aster racemosus) - Smooth White Oldfield Aster
Symphyotrichum undulatum (L.) G.L.Nesom (Syn. Aster undulatus) - Wavy-leaf Aster
Tanacetum parthenium  - Feverfew
Verbesina alternifolia (L.) Britton - Wingstem
Vernonia noveboracensis (L.) Michx. - New York Ironweed

Balsaminaceae - (Touch-me-not Family)
Impatiens capensis Meerb. – Common Jewelweed

Boraginaceae - (Borage Family)
Echium vulgare L. - Viper's Bugloss

Brassicaceae - (Mustard Family)
Arabidopsis lyrata L. - Lyre-leaved Rock Cress
Arabidopsis thaliana (L.) Heynh. - Mouse-ear Cress
Barbarea vulgaris R.Br. - Winter Cress
Camelina microcarpa Andrz. - Small-fruited False-flax
Cardamine angustata O.E.Schulz (Syn. Dentaria heterophylla) - Slender Toothwort
Cardamine hirsuta L. - Hairy Bitter-cress
Draba verna L. - Spring Draba, Whitlow-grass
Lepidium campestre (L.) R.Br. - Field Peppergrass
Lepidium virginicum L. - Wild Peppergrass

Campanulaceae - (Bellflower family)
Lobelia cardinalis L. - Cardinal flower
Lobelia inflata L. - Indian Tobacco
Lobelia siphilitica L. - Great Lobelia  [F, M, We]
Lobelia spicata Lam. - Spiked Lobelia
Triodanis perfoliata (L.) Nieuwl. (Syn. Specularia perfoliata) - Clasping Venus' Looking-glass

Caryophyllaceae - (Pink Family)
Cerastium arvense L. var. villosissimum (Muhl. ex Darl.) Hollick & Britt. (Syn. Cerastium arvense L. var. villosissimum Pennell) - Serpentine Chickweed
Cerastium vulgatum L. - Common Mouse-ear Chickweed
Dianthus armeria L. - Deptford Pink
Silene antirrhina L. - Sleepy Catchfly
Silene caroliniana Walter - Wild Pink
Silene latifolia Poir. - White Campion
Stellaria media (L.) Vill. - Common Chickweed

Chenopodiaceae - (Goosefoot Family)
Chenopodium album L. - Lamb's quarters

Cistaceae - (Rockrose Family)
Helianthemum bicknellii Fernald - Hairy Frostweed {G5, S1, E}
Lechea minor L. - Thyme-leaved Pinweed

Clusiaceae - (Mangosteen Family)
Hypericum canadense L. - Canadian St. John's Wort
Hypericum denticulatum Walter - Coppery St. John's Wort {G5, S2, T}
Hypericum gentianoides (L.) Britton, Sterns & Poggenb. - Pinweed [F, M]
Hypericum mutilum L. - Dwarf St. John's Wort
Hypericum perforatum L. - St. John's Wort
Hypericum punctatum Lam. - Spotted St. John's Wort
Hypericum virginicum L. - Marsh St. John's Wort

Convolvulaceae - (Morning glory Family)
Calystegia spithamea (L.) Pursh - Low Bindweed {G4, S2}
Convolvulus arvensis L. - Field Bindweed
Cuscuta gronovii Willd. - Common Dodder

Ericaceae - (Heath Family)
Chimaphila maculata (L.) Pursh - Spotted wintergreen
Chimaphila umbellata (L.) W.P.C.Barton - Pipsissewa
Epigaea repens L. - Trailing Arbutus
Monotropa uniflora L. - Indian-pipe

Fabaceae - (Bean Family)
Baptisia tinctoria (L.) R.Br. - Wild Indigo
Chamaecrista fasciculata (Michx.) Greene (Syn. Cassia fasciculata) - Large-flowered Partridge Pea
Chamaecrista nictitans (L.) Moench. (Syn. Cassia nictitans) - Wild Sensitive Plant
Crotalaria sagittalis L. - Rattlebox
Desmodium canadense (L.) DC. - Showy Tick-trefoil
Desmodium ciliare (Muhl.) DC. - Hairy Small-leaf Tick-trefoil
Desmodium cuspidatum (Muhl.) Loudon - Large-bracted Tick-trefoil
Desmodium lineatum (Michx.) DC. - Linear-leaved Tick-trefoil {G5, S1, E}
Desmodium marilandicum (L.) DC. - Smooth Small-leaved Tick-trefoil
Desmodium nudiflorum (L.) DC. - Naked-flowered Tick-trefoil
Desmodium paniculatum (L.) DC. - Panicled Tick-trefoil
Desmodium rigidum (Elliott) DC. - Rigid Tick-trefoil {G?, S1, E}
Lathyrus latifolius L. - Everlasting pea
Lespedeza cuneata (Dumont) G.Don - Chinese Lespedeza
Lespedeza stipulacea Maxim. - Korean Bushclover
Lespedeza virginica L.  - Slender Bushclover
Medicago lupulina L.  - Black Medic
Melilotus albus Desr. - White sweet clover
Melilotus officinalis Desr. - Yellow Sweet Clover
Strophostyles umbellata (Muhl.) Britton - Pink Wild Bean
Trifolium aureum Pollich - Large Hop Trefoil
Trifolium dubium Sibth. - Little Hop Clover
Trifolium pratense L. - Red Clover
Vicia angustifolia Reichard - Narrow-leaved Vetch

Gentianaceae - (Gentian Family)
Gentianopsis crinita (Froel.) Ma (Syn. Gentiana crinita) - Fringed gentian {G5, S1, E} 
Sabatia angularis (L.) Pursh - Rose Pink
Sabatia calycina (Lam.) A.Heller -

Lamiaceae - (Mint Family)
Cunila origanoides (L.) Britton - Common Dittany
Glechoma hederacea L. - Ground-ivy
Lamium amplexicaule L. - Henbit 
Lamium purpureum L. - Red Deadnettle 
Prunella vulgaris L. - Heal-all, Self-heal
Pycnanthemum flexuosum (Walter) Britton, Sterns & Poggenb. - Mountain-mint
Pycnanthemum tenuifolium Schrader - Narrow-leaved Mountain-mint
Scutellaria integrifolia L. - Hyssop Skullcap
Trichostema brachiatum L. (Syn. Isanthus brachiatus) - False Pennyroyal, Fluxweed

Linaceae - (Flax Family)
Linum medium (Planch.) Britton - Common Yellow Flax
Linum sulcatum Riddell - Grooved Yellow Flax {G5, S1, E}
Linum virginianum L. - Virginia Yellow Flax

Lythraceae - (Loosestrife Family)
Cuphea viscosissima Jacq. - Clammy Cuphea

Melastomataceae - (Meadow-beauty Family)
Rhexia mariana L. - Maryland Meadow Beauty

Onagraceae - (Evening Primrose Family)
Epilobium coloratum Biehler - Purple-leaved Willow-herb
Oenothera biennis L. - Common Evening Primrose
Oenothera fruticosa L. - Sundrops
Oenothera perennis L. - Small Sundrops
Oenothera tetragona Roth - Northern Sundrops

Orobanchaceae - (Broomrape Family)
Agalinis acuta Pennell - Sandplain Gerardia {G1, S1, E, LE}
Agalinis fasciculata (Elliott) Raf. - Fascicled Agalinis {G5, S1, E}
Agalinis obtusifolia Raf. - Blunt-leaf Agalinis {G4, S1, E}
Agalinis purpurea (L.) Pennell - Purple Gerardia 
Agalinis tenuifolia (Vahl) Raf. - Slender Gerardia
Aureolaria pedicularia (L.) Raf. - Fern-leaved False-foxglove

Oxalidaceae - (Wood-sorrel Family)
Oxalis dillenii Jacq. - Southern Yellow Wood-sorrel
Oxalis stricta L. - Common Yellow Wood-sorrel
Oxalis violacea L. - Violet Wood-sorrel [EU]

Papaveraceae - (Poppy Family)
Sanguinaria canadensis L. - Bloodroot

Phrymaceae - (Lopseed Family)
Mimulus ringens L. - Square-stemmed Monkey Flower

Phytolaccaceae - (Pokeweed Family)
Phytolacca americana L. - Pokeweed

Plantaginaceae - (Plantain Family)
Chelone glabra L. - White Turtlehead
Linaria vulgaris Hill. - Butter and eggs
Penstemon digitalis Nutt. - Foxglove, Tall White Beard-tongue
Plantago aristata Michx. - Bracted Plantain
Plantago lanceolata L. - Ribwort Plantain
Plantago rugelii Decne. - Broad-leaved Plantain
Veronica arvensis L. - Corn Speedwell
Veronica hederifolia L. - Ivy-leaf Speedwell
Veronica officinalis L. - Heath Speedwell
Veronica peregrina L. - Purslane Speedwell
Veronica persica Poir. - Persian Speedwell, Bird's-eye Speedwell
Veronica serpyllifolia L. - Thyme-leaf Speedwell

Polemoniaceae - (Phlox Family)
Phlox subulata L. - Moss Phlox, Moss Pink

Polygalaceae - (Milkwort Family)
Polygala verticillata L. - Whorled Milkwort

Polygonaceae - (Buckwheat Family)
Polygonum pensylvanicum L. - Pennsylvania Smartweed
Polygonum tenue Michx. - Slender Knotweed
Rumex crispus L. - Curley Dock

Portulacaceae - (Purslane Family)
Claytonia virginica L. - Eastern spring beauty
Talinum teretifolium Pursh - Flameflower {G4, S1}

Primulaceae - (Primrose Family)
Anagallis arvensis L. - Scarlet Pimpernel

Ranunculaceae - (Buttercup Family)
Anemone quinquefolia L. - Wood Anemone
Cimicifuga racemosa (L.) Nutt. - Black cohosh
Clematis virginiana L. - Virgin's Bower [Hand-out]
Hepatica americana (DC.) KerGawler - Round-lobed Hepatica
Thalictrum thalictroides (L.) Eames & Boivin - Rue anemone

Rosaceae - (Rose Family)
Potentilla canadensis L. - Dwarf Cinquefoil
Potentilla norvegica L. - Rough Cinquefoil
Potentilla recta L. - Rough-fruited Cinquefoil
Potentilla simplex Michx. - Common Cinquefoil
Sanguisorba canadensis L. - Canadian Burnet {G5, S2, T}

Rubiaceae - (Madder Family)
Houstonia caerulea L. (Syn. Hedyotis caerulea) - Bluets, Quaker Ladies
Houstonia purpurea L. (Syn. Hedyotis purpurea) - Large Houstonia [Hand-out]

Santalaceae - (Sandalwood Family)
Comandra umbellata (L.) Nutt. - Bastard Toadflax

Saxifragaceae - (Saxifrage Family)
Saxifraga virginiensis Michx. - Early Saxifrage

Scrophulariaceae - (Figwort Family)
Verbascum blattaria L. - Moth Mullein
Verbascum thapsus L. - Common Mullein

Solanaceae - (Nightshade Family)
Solanum carolinense L. - Carolina horsenettle
Solanum dulcamara L. - Bittersweet

Urticaceae - (Nettle Family)
Laportea canadensis (L.) Wedd. - Wood-nettle

Violaceae - (Violet Family)
Viola palmata L. - Palmate-leaved Violet
Viola pedata L. - Bird's-foot Violet (lilac & bicolor)
Viola rotundifolia Michx. - Yellow Violet
Viola sagittata Aiton (Syn. V. fimbriatula) - Arrow-leaf Violet
Viola sororia Willd. (Syn. V. papilionacea) -  Common Blue Violet

Class Liliopsida - Monocotyledons

Amaryllidaceae - (Amaryllis Family)
Hypoxis hirsuta (L.) Coville - Yellow Stargrass

Araceae - (Arum Family)
Acorus calamus L. - Sweet Flag, Calamus
Arisaema triphyllum (L.) Schott - Jack-in-the-Pulpit
Orontium aquaticum L. - Golden Club
Symplocarpus foetidus (L.) Nutt. – Eastern Skunk Cabbage

Commelinaceae - (Spiderwort Family)
Commelina communis L. - Asiatic Dayflower
Tradescantia virginiana L. - Spiderwort

Dioscoreaceae - (Yam Family)
Dioscorea villosa L. - Wild yam

Iridaceae - (Iris Family)
Sisyrinchium angustifolium Mill. - Stout Blue-eyed Grass
Sisyrinchium atlanticum E.P.Bicknell -
Sisyrinchium mucronatum Michx. - Slender Blue-eyed Grass

Lemnaceae - (Duckweed Family)
Lemna minor L. - Smaller Duckweed
Spirodela polyrhiza (L.) Schleid. - Greater Duckweed

Liliaceae - (Lily Family)
Allium canadense L. - Meadow Garlic
Allium vineale L. - Crow Garlic
Asparagus officinalis L. - Garden Asparagus
Hemerocallis fulva L. - Orange Daylily
Lilium superbum L. - Turk's-cap Lily
Ornithogalum umbellatum L. - Star-of-Bethlehem
Polygonatum biflorum (Walter) Elliott - Smooth Solomon's-seal
Maianthemum racemosum (L.) Link (Syn. Smilicina racemosa) - False Solomon's Seal
Veratrum viride Aiton - Green false hellebore

Orchidaceae - (Orchid Family)
Cypripedium acaule Aiton - Pink Lady's Slipper
Galearis spectabilis L. - Showy Orchis
Goodyera pubescens (Willd.) R.Br. - Downy Rattlesnake Plantain
Liparis loeselii (L.) Rich. - Loesel's Twayblade
Spiranthes cernua (L.) Rich. - Nodding Ladies'-tresses
Spiranthes lacera (Raf.) Raf. (Syn. S. gracilis) - Slender Ladies'-tresses

Smilacaceae - (Greenbrier Family)
Smilax herbacea L. - Carrion Flower

References

Further reading

See also
 Woody Plants of Soldiers Delight
 Graminoids of Soldiers Delight
 Ferns of Soldiers Delight
 Lichens of Soldiers Delight
 Lichens of Maryland

External links 
Baltimore County Public Library

Soldiers Delight
Protected areas of Baltimore County, Maryland